Domenico Gallo (1730 – c. 1768) was an Italian composer and violinist. Born in Venice in 1730, Gallo composed mostly church music, including a Stabat Mater. Gallo also composed violin sonatas, symphonies and possibly violin concertos.

Some trio sonatas by Domenico Gallo were long attributed to Giovanni Battista Pergolesi, including those upon which Igor Stravinsky based his music for the ballet Pulcinella. In fact, half of the surviving works by Gallo were once attributed to Pergolesi, probably because Gallo was little known, Pergolesi was famous and his name would sell the music.

References

External links
Biography

1730 births
1760s deaths
Year of death uncertain
18th-century Italian male musicians
18th-century Italian composers
18th-century composers
Italian male composers
Italian classical violinists
Male classical violinists
Musicians from Venice